Chestnut Hill is an unincorporated community and census-designated place (CDP) in Northampton County, Pennsylvania. It was first listed as a CDP prior to the 2020 census. Its population as of the 2020 census was 6,689.  It is part of the Lehigh Valley metropolitan area, which had a population of 861,899 and was the 68th most populous metropolitan area in the U.S. as of 2020.

Chestnut Hill is on the eastern edge of Northampton County, in the southeastern quadrant of Forks Township. It is bordered to the south by the city of Easton and to the east by the Delaware River, which forms the Pennsylvania–New Jersey border. It is bordered to the west by Sullivan Trail (old Pennsylvania Route 115), which leads northwest  to Stockertown. Pennsylvania Route 611 follows the Delaware River along the eastern edge of the community, leading south into Easton and northeast  to Portland.

Chestnut Hill is a  ridge which runs along the southern border of the CDP, overlooking the Delaware River.

References 

Census-designated places in Northampton County, Pennsylvania
Census-designated places in Pennsylvania